Samuel George Lewis (born 9 July 1994) is an English singer-songwriter, musician and record producer. He is mostly known for collaborating with many artists from Tove Lo, Dua Lipa, Victoria Monét, Jessie Ware, JP Cooper, Raye and Ray BLK to Bruno Major, Frances, Clairo and LANY.

Career

2014–2016: Career beginnings
A native of Reading, England, Lewis first became interested in music in his teens and played in several bands before he started experimenting with remixing tracks. Influenced by the introspective pop of Bon Iver and James Blake, as well as the club-ready hip-hop of artists like Common, Timbaland, and The Neptunes, Lewis began posting his own evocative, moody tracks online. He quickly built a loyal following, and eventually secured a residency DJing at Liverpool's Chibuku Club. He stated, "Being a resident DJ at Chibuku in Liverpool was fundamental. It allowed me to spend a lot of time behind the decks and see a different top DJ every week. Genre-wise, Chibuku has had everything: house, dubstep, techno, drum 'n' bass. The first night I went to, Ben Klock was playing downstairs and Andy C upstairs. There aren't many places in the world where you'd get those two on the same line-up. You have this new wave of electronic producers who are largely SoundCloud-based, making electronic music without any thought to the club. That's great. But there's so much to be learned from the old-school approach of resident DJing."

In 2014, Lewis signed his debut record deal with PMR Records, who gives a home to other artists such as Jessie Ware and Disclosure, describing it as an incredibly exciting moment for him. He said, "I spent every day of the summer in my bedroom writing a load of music. My friend Grant had started managing me, and he was meeting a load of people in London. My music got sent round by some A&R's, who passed it on to the PMR guys. PMR Records was one of my favourite labels at the time, so when they called us in for a meeting I was so excited. I had no idea they were interested in signing me, but after one meeting and playing everything I had, they decided to sign me straight away!" After being signed, he grabbed the attention of Disclosure and they invited him to play at a 2,000-year-old castle in Ibiza with them.

In 2015, he released his debut extended play, entitled Shivers, which features guest appearances from Louis Mattrs and JP Cooper.

In 2016, he released his second extended play, entitled Yours, which features its lead single and title track, "Yours", featuring un-credited vocals from rising singer-songwriter Raye. He also collaborated on songs with Howard Lawrence and Gallant.

2017–present: Dusk, Dark and Dawn
Throughout 2017, he began releasing more singles and got brought to the attention of Virgin EMI Records to which he was signed to later on. In 2018, he announced that he was working on his debut album, which was set to be released in three parts or extended plays – later revealed to be named Dusk, Dark and Dawn. The project's lead single and first song to be released from Dusk was also revealed, entitled "Aura", featuring vocals from J Warner, which was done so on 18 January 2018. It was shortly succeeded by "Coming Up" released as its second single. Dusk was released on 6 April 2018.

Later on in the year, he went to work on music in Los Angeles, where he made and released two breakthrough collaborations – "Better", with American bedroom producer Clairo, and "Hurting", featuring British dance music duo AlunaGeorge. "Better" was described by Clairo as "one of the first big steps [she's] made into pop music" and also one of her first proper collaborations with another artist. "Hurting" was released a while after as the first single from Lewis' second chapter of his debut album Dark. SG Lewis said about the song, "Aluna and I met for the first time in LA earlier this year, and I was talking to her about the album concept, and in particular, Dark. Aluna has been a part of so many dance records that I love, so I knew I wanted to make a club track with her! After we ate burritos and hung out, we made "Hurting" super quickly – the whole process was super natural between the two of us, and she has such an amazing ear for production." The song was also praised when it was named Clara Amfo’s "Track of the Week". As well as being played across Radio 1, 1xtra and Beats1, the track reached the number one spot on the iTunes Electronic Chart.

Prior to the release of Dark, SG Lewis released two more songs called "A.A.T.", featuring Drew Love, and "Again", featuring Totally Enormous Extinct Dinosaurs,. Dark was eventually released on 9 November 2018, featuring additional collaborations from affiliate Bruno Major and Dot Major.

In 2019, he released the first single, entitled "Blue", from the third and supposedly last phase of his debut album Dawn. The second single from Dawn, entitled "Throwaway", was released as the second collaborative track between Lewis and Clairo, after "Better". Lewis said about the song, "Clairo is one of my favourite artists to work with, and a good friend of mine" says SG: “Throwaway was written in LA one evening – we were both super tired and had some shit going on in our respective personal lives. We sat and talked for ages, and after that Throwaway flowed out in no time at all. Clairo is such a special artist and an incredible songwriter, and I’m super proud of this song."

Later on in the year, he made his second appearance at Coachella in April, where he performed alongside AlunaGeorge and Col3trane, among others. He also teased an unreleased track with Australian singer Ruel, which was announced to be the third track from Dawn. It was later revealed to be called "Flames" and was released on 10 May 2019. Lewis said about the song, "I was put onto Ruel's music about 18th months ago, and watching his growth since then has been amazing. He's got such soul to his voice for someone of his age, it's crazy. "Flames" is the final preview of Dawn before the whole thing drops, and I can't wait to share the whole thing." He also announced that he was to perform in Dreamland Margate in June of this year and also at Printworks in London on 1 February 2020, making it his biggest headline show to date.

Lewis' debut album, Times, was released on 19 February 2021.

Discography

Studio albums

Extended plays

Singles

As lead artist

As featured artist

Guest appearances

Songwriting and production credits

Remixes

References

1994 births
Living people
English electronic musicians
English male musicians
English male singer-songwriters
English record producers
Synth-pop singers